Mangal Ram is an Indian politician from the Bharatiya Janata Party and a member of the Rajasthan Legislative Assembly representing the Kathumar Vidhan Sabha constituency of Rajasthan.

References 

1962 births
Living people
Bharatiya Janata Party politicians from Rajasthan
Rajasthan MLAs 2013–2018